Antonio La Bruna (born 28 December 1959) is an Italian wrestler. He competed at the 1980 Summer Olympics and the 1984 Summer Olympics, where he lost to eventual Olympic champion Randy Lewis. He was also previously an Italian sambo champion.

He is presently a coach for the Livorno Wrestling Group.

References

1959 births
Living people
Italian male sport wrestlers
Olympic wrestlers of Italy
Wrestlers at the 1980 Summer Olympics
Wrestlers at the 1984 Summer Olympics
Sportspeople from Livorno
20th-century Italian people
21st-century Italian people